Skeleton Lake may refer to:
Skeleton Lake (Ontario), in the Muskoka region
Skeleton Lake (Alberta), near Boyle
Roopkund or Skeleton Lake, a high altitude glacial lake in Uttarakhand, India, the location of 300 to 600 skeletons at the edge of a lake